The Story of Anastasia and in the UK, Is Anna Anderson Anastasia? (German: Anastasia, die letzte Zarentochter), is a German film directed by Falk Harnack. The 1956 film is based on the true story of Anna Anderson, who was pulled from the Landwehr Canal in Berlin in 1920 and later claimed to be Anastasia, the youngest daughter of Tsar Nicholas II of Russia. The entire family was executed in the Russian Revolution, but this was not confirmed until their graves were discovered in 1991 and 2007.

The American film Anastasia, directed by Anatole Litvak and featuring Ingrid Bergman appeared the same year.

Cast 
 Lilli Palmer as Anna Anderson / Anastasia
 Ivan Desny as Gleb Botkin
 Rudolf Fernau as Serge Botkin
 Tilla Durieux as the Tsar's mother
 Dorothea Wieck as Grand Duchess Olga Romanov
 Ellen Schwiers as Princess Katharina (Xenia Leeds)
 Käthe Braun as Frau von Rathleff-Keilmann
 Margot Hielscher as Crown Princess Cecilie
 Otto Graf as Duke of Leuchtenberg
 Franziska Kinz as Duchess of Leuchtenberg
 Hans Krull as Friedrich Ernst, Prince of Saxon-Altenburg
 Adelheid Seeck as Princess Irene of Prussia
 Fritz Tillmann as Baron von Pleskau
 Alice Treff as Baroness von Seekendorf
 Erik von Loewis as Baron Valepp
 Susanne von Almassy as Frau Stevens
 Eva Bubat as Gertrud Schanzkowsky
 Berta Drews as Fräulein Peuthert
 Maria Sebaldt as Trollop
 Reinhold Bernt as Landpoliceman
 Paul Bildt as Volkov
 Emmy Burg as Nurse Schwarzkopf
 Peter Carsten as Soldier Tchaikovski
 Erika Dannhoff as Frau von Pleskau
 Fritz Eberth as Yurovski
 Kurt Heintel as Kotov
 Lucie Höflich as Frau Bäumle
 Karl Klüsner as Dr. Kersten
 Reinhard Kolldehoff as Fichte
 Stanislav Ledinek as Voroneff
 Robert Meyn as German lawyer
 Marina Ried as Doris Wingender
 Traute Rose as Charwoman
 Edgar Ott as Ranger
 Peter Capell
 Wolf Martini
 Werner Peters
 Wolfgang Preiss
 Charles Regnier
 Helmuth Rudolph
 Ernst Schröder
 Siegfried Schürenberg
 Paul Wagner
 Kurt Weitkamp
 Dieter Zeidler

References

External links 
 

West German films
1956 films
1950s German-language films
Films set in the 1920s
Films about amnesia
Cultural depictions of Grand Duchess Anastasia Nikolaevna of Russia
German black-and-white films